Cristian Higuita (born 12 January 1994) is a Colombian footballer who plays as a midfielder for Atlético Junior in Categoría Primera A.

Club career

Deportivo Cali 
Higuita made his debut with Deportivo Cali in 2009. A year later, he played a minor part in Cali's campaign winning the 2010 Copa Colombia. In 2011, he made his debut for Cali in Categoría Primera A and during the 2014 season helped the club capture the 2014 Superliga Colombiana.

Orlando City 
In January 2015 it was reported that Orlando City SC would be signing Higuita along with his Deportivo Cali teammate Carlos Rivas. He started the team's first ever MLS game, a 1–1 draw at home to fellow new expansion side New York City on 8 March. On 1 August 2015, Higuita scored his first goal for the team in a 5–2 win at home to Columbus Crew. Higuita finished the 2015 season with 4.3 tackles per game and a passing success rate of 87.1 percent.

On 6 August 2016, in order to regain match fitness, Higuita was loaned to Orlando City B for their match against Toronto FC II. In September 2016, Higuita was ranked #21 on the MLSSoccer.com ranking of the top 24 players under 24 years of age. Higuita was one of Orlando City's protected players for the 2016 MLS Expansion Draft.

Prior to the beginning of the 2019 season, Higuita was presented with a commemorative plaque in honor of his 100 appearances with Orlando City across MLS, US Open Cup and international friendlies (namely against Ponte Preta, Flamengo and Stoke City). Higuita's contract expired at the end of the 2019 season. He departed as the club's leading appearance maker with 108 across all competitions.

Atlético Junior
On 17 December 2019, Higuita returned to Colombia to sign with Atlético Junior.

International career
Higuita was called up to represent the Colombia U20s at the 2013 South American Youth Football Championship. Higuita made one appearance in the tournament, coming on as a half-time substitute in a 2–1 group stage defeat to Chile. Colombia went on to win the tournament.

Higuita was named in Colombia's provisional squad for Copa América Centenario in 2016 but was cut from the final squad.

Personal
Higuita holds a U.S. green card which qualifies him as a domestic player for MLS roster purposes.

Career statistics

Club

Honors

Club
Deportivo Cali
Copa Colombia: 2010
Superliga Colombiana: 2014

National Team
Colombia
South American Youth Championship: 2013

References

External links
 
 
 Cristian Higuita at Football.com

1994 births
Living people
Colombian footballers
Colombian expatriate footballers
Deportivo Cali footballers
Atlético Junior footballers
Orlando City SC players
Orlando City B players
Association football midfielders
Expatriate soccer players in the United States
Categoría Primera A players
Major League Soccer players
USL Championship players
Colombia under-20 international footballers
Colombian expatriate sportspeople in the United States
Footballers from Cali